Operation 2019 is a 2018 Indian Telugu-language political action drama film directed by Karanam P. Babji and starring Srikanth, Yagna Shetty  and Diksha Panth.

Cast
Srikanth as Uma Shankar
Yagna Shetty as Umadevi
Diksha Panth
Sivakrishna as MLA Narayana Murthy
Posani Krishna Murali
Nagineedu
Fish Venkat
Manchu Manoj as a cop (cameo appearance)
Sunil as himself (cameo appearance)

Soundtrack
Music by Rap Rock Shakeel. In a review of the soundtrack album, Neeshi Nyayapati of The Times of India wrote that "Jarring and even annoying for most part, the numbers on this album have nothing new to offer despite featuring such established vocalists".
"Kaka Nuvvu Keka" sung by Madhu Priya with lyrics by Ramajogayya Sastry
"Missed Call Mini Mini" sung by Geetha Madhuri, Rap Rock Shakeel and Swarag with lyrics by Ramajogayya Sastry
"Amrutapani Andamnadi" sung by Moushmi Neha with lyrics by Bhashashree
"Life Is Like A Party Time" sung by Baba Sehgal with lyrics by Ramajogayya Sastry
"Nara Naramuna" sung and lyrics by Swarag Keertan
"Vandemataram" sung by Kaala Bhairava with lyrics by Suddala Ashok Teja

Reception
A critic from 123telugu opined that "On the whole, Operation 2019 is an insipid political drama which lacks basic punch in the proceedings". Sekhar Kusuma of The Times of India Samayam gave the film a rating of 2.5 out of 5 and praised Srikanth's performance. A critic from Sakshi felt that the first half was slow and that the second half was better.

References